Mađere may refer to:

 Mađere (Prokuplje)
 Mađere (Ražanj)